Geogepa stenochorda is a species of moth of the family Tortricidae. It is found in Japan on the islands of Hokkaido, Honshu, Shikoku and Kyushu and in China in the province of Anhui.

The length of the forewings is 5.5–7.5 mm in males and 7–8.5 mm in females. The forewings are light ochreous, with a narrow bronze median fascia and a distinct blackish discal spot. There is one generation per year.

References

Moths described in 1948
Archipini